Heron Lake is a reservoir in Rio Arriba County, New Mexico in the southwestern United States.  The reservoir is part of the San Juan-Chama Project, which connects the San Juan River in Colorado to the Rio Chama, which is part of the Rio Grande watershed. Lake Heron is 80 miles northwest of Santa Fe.

Heron Dam is owned and operated by the United States Bureau of Reclamation.

The southern shore is the location of Heron Lake State Park, featuring over 200 camping and picnic sites, and two improved boat ramps.  The lake is a destination for salmon and trout fishing, as well as for small boat sailing.  Boat speeds are restricted by a 'no-wake' policy.  A  hiking trail crosses the Rio Chama Gorge via a pedestrian suspension bridge, and then runs southwest through wooded terrain to the grounds of El Vado Lake State Park.

The lake, dam, and state park are named for Kenneth A. Heron, an engineer in the early 1900s who first explored the concept of diverting water from Colorado to the desert regions of southern New Mexico.

References

External links
 Heron Lake State Park

Reservoirs in New Mexico
State parks of New Mexico
Parks in Rio Arriba County, New Mexico
Lakes of Rio Arriba County, New Mexico